The following is the list of world records in finswimming recognised by the sport's governing body, Confédération Mondiale des Activités Subaquatiques (CMAS). CMAS does not recognise short course records.

Requirements for recognition of records 
As of January 2013, CMAS recognises world and other records for the following techniques and distances for both males and females in the age groups of Senior (i.e. 18 years and older) and Junior (i.e. 12 to 17 years old) where these are made in an Olympic-size swimming pool (i.e. 50m length) and are measured by electronic automatic officiating equipment:
Surface finswimming (SF) - individual races for distances of 50m, 100m, 200m, 400m, 800m and 1500m, and relays for 4 × 100 m and 4 × 200 m.
Bi-Fins (BF, also known as ‘Stereo-fins’) - 50m, 100m, 200m and 400m.
Apnoea finswimming (AP also known as ‘apnea’) - 50m.
Immersion finswimming (IM) - 100m, 400m and 800m.

The International Rules also allow for recognition of a record swimming time in the first lap of a relay race or an immediate distance as part of a longer swimming distance. Records made at the CMAS World and Continental Championships and at the World Games are automatically registered.  Records made outside of the above-mentioned competitions can be recognised as subject to the attempt being an individual attempt and that at least three days public notice of the attempt is given.  National records can be recognised if a record's time is equal to or better than the prevailing world record.

As of January 2013, the International Rules do not discuss the matter of records made for open water/long distance finswimming.

Records

Men

|- bgcolor=#DDDDDD
|colspan=9|
|-valign="top"

|- bgcolor=#DDDDDD
|colspan=9|
|-valign="top"

|- bgcolor=#DDDDDD
|colspan=9|
|-valign="top"

|- bgcolor=#DDDDDD
|colspan=9|
|-valign="top"

Women

|- bgcolor=#DDDDDD
|colspan=9|
|-valign="top"

|- bgcolor=#DDDDDD
|colspan=9|
|-valign="top"

|- bgcolor=#DDDDDD
|colspan=9|
|-valign="top"

|- bgcolor=#DDDDDD
|colspan=9|
|-valign="top"

Mixed

Junior – boys

|- bgcolor=#DDDDDD
|colspan=9|
|-valign="top"

|- bgcolor=#DDDDDD
|colspan=9|
|-valign="top"

|- bgcolor=#DDDDDD
|colspan=9|
|-valign="top"

|- bgcolor=#DDDDDD
|colspan=9|
|-valign="top"

Junior – girls

|- bgcolor=#DDDDDD
|colspan=9|
|-valign="top"

|- bgcolor=#DDDDDD
|colspan=9|
|-valign="top"

|- bgcolor=#DDDDDD
|colspan=9|
|-valign="top"

|- bgcolor=#DDDDDD
|colspan=9|
|-valign="top"

Junior – mixed

See also
List of European records in finswimming

References

External links
CMAS Finswimming Commission Records webpage
World records Updated 4 September 2022
World junior records Updated 1 March 2022

Finswimming
Finswimming records
World records in swimming